USS B-3 (SS-12) was one of three B-class submarines built for the United States Navy in the first decade of the 20th century.

Description
The B-class submarines were enlarged versions of the preceding Plunger class. They displaced  on the surface and  submerged. The B-class boats had a crew of one officer and nine enlisted men.

For surface running, they were powered by one  gasoline engine that drove the single propeller shaft. When submerged the propeller was driven by a  electric motor. The boats could reach  on the surface and  underwater.

The B-class boats were armed with two 18 inch (450 mm) torpedo tubes in the bow. They carried two reloads, for a total of four torpedoes.

Construction and career
B-3 was laid down by Fore River Shipbuilding Company in Quincy, Massachusetts, under a subcontract from Electric Boat Company of then New Suffolk L. I., as Tarantula, making her the first ship of the United States Navy to be named for the tarantula. She was launched on 30 March 1907 sponsored by Mrs. George S. Radford, wife of Naval Constructor Radford, and commissioned on 3 December 1907.

Service history
She reported to the Atlantic Fleet, and Tarantula operated along the Atlantic coast with the First and Second Submarine Flotillas on training and experimental exercises until going into reserve at Charleston Navy Yard on 6 November 1909. She was recommissioned on 15 April 1910 and served with the Atlantic Torpedo Fleet until assigned to the Reserve Torpedo Group, Charleston Navy Yard on 9 May 1911 and placed out of commission on 4 December 1912. On 17 November, Tarantula was renamed B-3.

On 6 December 1912, B-3 was towed to Norfolk, Virginia, and loaded onto the collier  for transfer to the Asiatic Station. Arriving at Cavite, Philippine Islands on 30 April 1913, B-3 was launched from Ajax on 12 May. She was recommissioned on 2 September and remained in the Philippines where she served with Submarine Division 4, Torpedo Flotilla, Asiatic Fleet.

Excerpts from the autobiography of Captain C.Q. Wright indicate he was the "Officer in Charge" of the B3 at Cavite. His crew launched the two subs off the deck of the Ajax. They then retrofitted the gasoline powered engines and motors in the Cavite Navy Yard shop readying the subs for a 48-hour shake down cruise. The first tour of duty began with sealed orders at 1900 hours, guarding Manila Bay's Naval Base Manila, in the event hostilities broke out with Japan. Orders were to sink any Japanese war vessel that came into sight, although none did.
1914: B-3 awarded the "Battle Efficiency Pennant" for the best operating submarine in the US fleet, C.O. Ensign C.Q. Wright.
Decommissioned at Cavite on 25 July 1921, B-3 was subsequently used as a target.

See also
USS B-1
USS B-2

Notes

References

External links

United States B-class submarines
World War I submarines of the United States
Ships sunk as targets
Shipwrecks in Manila Bay
Ships built in Quincy, Massachusetts
1907 ships
Maritime incidents in 1922